EBR may refer to:

Places
 East Baton Rouge Parish, Louisiana, United States
 Edenbridge railway station, in England

Military

Units
 East Bengal Regiment, Bangladesh

Equipment
 Mk 14 Enhanced Battle Rifle
 Panhard EBR, a light armoured car

Other
 Eastern Bengal Railway of British India
 Ebrié language
 Electronic Book Review, a scholarly journal
 Emphasized Bible, a translation of the Bible 
 Environmental Bill of Rights, in Ontario, Canada
 Erik Buell Racing, an American motorcycle company
 Extended boot record
 Experimental Breeder Reactor I, a decommissioned nuclear research reactor
 Electro-biochemical reactor
 European Business Register
 Evidence-based research